The Nevada Wolf Pack baseball team is a varsity intercollegiate athletic team of the University of Nevada, Reno in Reno, Nevada, United States. The team is a member of the Mountain West Conference, which is part of the NCAA Division I. Nevada's first baseball team was fielded in 1957. The team plays its home games at William Peccole Park in Reno, Nevada. The Wolf Pack are coached by Jake McKinley.

Notable players

Shawn Barton
Eddie Bonine
Ryan Church
Chris Dickerson
Andy Dominique
T. J. Friedl
Chris Gimenez
Brett Hayes
Derek Hines
Joe Inglett
Bill Ireland
Kevin Kouzmanoff
Corky Miller
Lyle Overbay
Pete Padgett
Chris Prieto
Chad Qualls
Darrell Rasner
Konrad Schmidt
Braden Shipley
Chris Singleton

See also
 List of NCAA Division I baseball programs

References

External links
 

 
Baseball teams established in 1957
1957 establishments in Nevada